Trupanea mallochi is a species of fruit fly in the genus Plaumannimyia of the family Tephritidae.

Distribution
Mexico, Nicaragua, Costa Rica.

References

Tephritinae
Insects described in 1940
Diptera of South America